A knockout (abbreviated to KO or K.O.) is a fight-ending, winning criterion in several full-contact combat sports, such as boxing, kickboxing, muay thai, mixed martial arts, karate, some forms of taekwondo and other sports involving striking, as well as fighting-based video games. A full knockout is considered any legal strike or combination thereof that renders an opponent unable to continue fighting.

The term is often associated with a sudden traumatic loss of consciousness caused by a physical blow. Single powerful blows to the head (particularly the jawline and temple) can produce a cerebral concussion or a carotid sinus reflex with syncope and cause a sudden, dramatic KO. Body blows, particularly the liver punch, can cause progressive, debilitating pain that can also result in a KO.

In boxing and kickboxing, a knockout is usually awarded when one participant falls to the canvas and is unable to rise to their feet within a specified period of time, typically because of exhaustion, pain, disorientation, or unconsciousness. For example, if a boxer is knocked down and is unable to continue the fight within a ten-second count, they are counted as having been knocked out and their opponent is awarded the KO victory.

In mixed martial arts (MMA) competitions, no time count is given after a knockdown, as the sport allows submission grappling as well as ground and pound. If a fighter loses consciousness ("goes limp") as a result of legal strikes, it is declared a KO. Even if the fighter loses consciousness for a brief moment and wakes up again to continue to fight, the fight is stopped and a KO is declared. As many MMA fights can take place on the mat rather than standing, it is possible to score a KO via ground and pound, a common victory for grapplers. 

In fighting games such as Street Fighter and Tekken, a player scores a knockout by fully depleting the opponent's health bar, with the victor being awarded the round. The player who wins the most rounds, either by scoring the most knockouts or by having more vitality remaining when time expires during each round, wins the match. This differs from combat sports in reality, where a knockout ends the match immediately. However, some fighting games aim for a more realistic experience, with titles like Fight Night adhering to the rules of professional boxing, although technically they are classified as sports games, and share many of the same features as NFL and NBA video games.

Technical knockout

A technical knockout (TKO or T.K.O.), stoppage, or referee stopped contest (RSC) is declared when the referee decides during a round that a fighter cannot safely continue the match for any reason.  Certain sanctioning bodies also allow the official attending physician at ringside to stop the fight as well.  In many regions, a TKO is declared when a fighter is knocked down three times in one round. 

In MMA bouts, the referee may declare a TKO if a fighter cannot intelligently defend themselves while being repeatedly struck.

Double knockout 
A double knockout, both in real-life combat sports and in fighting-based video games, occurs when both fighters trade blows and knock each other out simultaneously and are both unable to continue fighting. In such cases, the match is declared a draw. In fighting games such as Street Fighter, Dead or Alive, and Tekken, a draw is counted as a loss for both players.

Physical characteristics

Little is known as to what exactly causes one to be knocked unconscious, but many agree it is related to trauma to the brain stem. This usually happens when the head rotates sharply, often as a result of a strike. There are three general manifestations of such trauma:
 a typical knockout, which results in a sustained (three seconds or more) loss of consciousness (comparable to general anesthesia, in that the recipient emerges and has lost memory of the event).
 a "flash" knockout, when a very transient (less than three seconds) loss of consciousness occurs (in the context of a knock-down) and the recipient often maintains awareness and memory of the combat.
 a "stunning", a "dazing" or a fighter being "out on his feet", when basic consciousness is maintained (and the fighter never leaves his feet) despite a general loss of awareness and extreme distortions in proprioception, balance, visual fields, and auditory processing. Referees are taught specifically to watch for this state, as it cannot be improved by sheer willpower and usually means the fighter is already concussed and unable to safely defend themselves.

A basic principle of boxing and other combat sports is to defend against this vulnerability by keeping both hands raised about the face and the chin tucked in. This may still be ineffective if the opponent punches effectively to the solar plexus.

A fighter who becomes unconscious from a strike with sufficient knockout power is referred to as having been knocked out or KO'd (kay-ohd). Losing balance without losing consciousness is referred to as being knocked down ("down but not out"). Repeated blows to the head, regardless of whether they cause loss of consciousness, may in severe cases cause strokes or paralysis in the immediacy, and over time have been linked to permanent neurodegenerative diseases such as chronic traumatic encephalopathy ("punch-drunk syndrome"). Because of this, many physicians advise against sports involving knockouts.

Knockdown

A knockdown occurs when a fighter touches the floor of the ring with any part of the body other than the feet following a hit, but is able to rise back up and continue fighting. The term is also used if the fighter is hanging on to the ropes, caught between the ropes, or is hanging over the ropes and is unable to fall to the floor and cannot protect himself. A knockdown triggers a count by the referee (normally to 10); if the fighter fails the count, then the fight is ended as a KO.

A flash knockdown is a knockdown in which the fighter hits the canvas but recovers quickly enough that a count is not started.

Knockout records

Top 10 boxers by most KOs
 Billy Bird (138)
 Archie Moore (132)
 Young Stribling (129)
 Sam Langford (128)
 Buck Smith (120)
 Kid Azteca (114)
 George Odwell (111)
 Sugar Ray Robinson, Alabama Kid (108)
 Peter Maher (107)
 Sandy Saddler (103)

Top 10 boxing champions (including interims) by KO percentage
Inactive National Boxing Association, World Colored Boxing Championship as well as list on List of current world boxing champions and European Boxing Union.

 Edwin Valero, Artur Beterbiev (100%)
 Deontay Wilder (98%)
 Alfonso Zamora (97%)
 Ángel Acosta, Dmitry Kudryashov, Jonathan Guzmán (96%)
 Carlos Zárate Serna, Wilfredo Gomez, Frank Bruno (95%)
 Gervonta Davis, Gerald McClellan, David Haye (93%)
 Yuniel Dorticos, Gary Mason (92%)
 Anthony Joshua, Vitali Klitschko, In-Chul Baek (91%)  
 Aaron Pryor, Miguel Berchelt, George Foreman (89%)
 Shannon Briggs, Khaosai Galaxy, Gennady Golovkin,  David Benavidez, Mike Tyson, Rocky Marciano (88%)

Top 10 MMA fighters by most KOs 
 Travis Fulton (143)
 Igor Vovchanchyn (41)
 Travis Wiuff (39)
 Luís Santos (38)
 Joe Riggs (37)
 Paul Daley (35)
 Gilbert Yvel (34)
 Alexander Shlemenko (32)
 Mirko Filipovic (30)
 Melvin Manhoef (29)

Top 10 MMA (champions, challengers) fighters by KO percentage
Fighters from inactive Pride Fighting Championships and active UFC/Bellator plus champions and former champions from other organizations.

 Melvin Manhoef (91%)
 Jimi Manuwa (88%)
 Conor McGregor, Jiri Prochazka, Cain Velasquez, Yoel Romero, Gilbert Yvel (86%)
  Cody Garbrandt, Justin Gaethje (83%)
 Derrick Lewis (81%)
 Mirko Filipovic, Mauricio Rua (78%)
 Wanderlei Silva, Mark Hunt, Cristiane Justino (77%)
 Stipe Miocic (76%)
 Anthony Johnson, Igor Vovchanchyn (73%) 
 Junior Dos Santos, Robbie Lawler (71%)

Most consecutive KOs
 Boxing: LaMar Clark (42)

Note: Considering Clark's unbeaten run of 44–0 with 44 knockouts, one should take into account he faced limited to no opposition; his first bout with a top-ten ranked opponent, who happened to be Bartolo Soni (12–2–1), ended with a TKO loss for him. Two other notable cases of highly questionable consecutive knockout records in boxing history were Peter McNeeley, running 36–1 with 30 knockouts before facing recently paroled Mike Tyson (41–1–0), and Richie Melito, who built up a record of 18–0 with 17 knockouts and was dubbed the "White Tyson" before Bert Cooper (34–17) stopped him. Less notable but nevertheless mentionable cases include Don Steele, running 41–0 with 38 KOs before facing off Brian Nielsen (38–0), and Faruq Saleem, running 38–0 with 32 KOs before he faced casual actor Shawn McLean (3–4–0).
 MMA: Travis Fulton (10)

Most 1st round KOs and most consecutive 1st round KOs
 Boxing: Peter Maher (50)
 Consecutive/Boxing: Ali Raymi (22)
 MMA: Travis Fulton (68) Joe Riggs (26)
 Consecutive/MMA: Igor Vovchanchyn, Travis Fulton (7)

Top 10 kickboxers by most KOs
 Changpuek Kiatsongrit (178)
 Frank Lobman (100)
 Toshio Fujiwara (99)
 Andy Souwer (98)
 Ramon Dekkers (95) 
 Badr Hari (92) 
 Fabrice Aurieng (89)
 Mike Zambidis (86)
 Branko Cikatic (82)
 Peter Aerts (81)

Top 10 Kickboxers (champions, challengers) by KO percentage

K-1, K-2 and Glory champions and Grand-Prix  Winners as well as champions from other promotions.

Andrew Thomson, Kevin Rosier (100%)
 Ginty Vrede (95%)
 Branko Cikatić (94%)
 Mite Yine, Dennis Alexio, Abiral Ghimire (93%)
 Besim Kabashi, Alain Ngalani (92%)
 Frank Lobman (91%)
 Benny Urquidez, Dustin Jacoby, Jean-Yves Theriault (90%)
 Nicholas Pettas (89%)
 Alessandro Riguccini (88%)
 Zack Mwekassa, Ben Edwards, Badr Hari, Jean-Claude Leuyer (87%)

Boxing's 50 knockout club (professional boxers with 50 or more knockouts)

 Billy Bird 138
 Archie Moore 132
 Young Stribling 126
 Sam Langford 126
 Buck Smith 120
 Kid Azteca 114
 George Odwell 111
 Sugar Ray Robinson 108
 Alabama Kid 108
 Peter Maher (boxer) 107
 Sandy Saddler 103
 Henry Armstrong 101
 Joe Gans 100
 Jimmy Wilde 98
 Jorge Castro (boxer) 90
 Tiger Jack Fox 89
 Jock McAvoy 88
 Julio César Chávez 86
 Yori Boy Campas 83
 Chalky Wright 83
 Tommy Freeman 83
 Jose Luis Ramirez 82
 Charles Ledoux 81
 Ted Kid Lewis 80
 Fritzie Zivic 80
 Rubén Olivares 79
 George Godfrey 77
 George Chaney 76
 Torpedo Billy Murphy 76
 Ceferino Garcia 74
 Primo Carnera 72
 Benny Bass 72
 Rodolfo Gonzalez (boxer) 71
 Tommy Ryan 71
 Roberto Durán 70
 Benny Leonard 70
 Jesus Pimentel 68
 Fred Fulton 68
 Earnie Shavers 68
 George Foreman 68
 Joe Jeanette 68
 Bill Brennan (boxer) 68
 Lou Brouillard 67
 Tommy Gomez 67
 Pedro Carrasco 66
 Billy Petrolle 66
 Marcel Cerdan 66
 Jack Dillon 66
 Lee Savold 65
 Willie Pep 65
 Elmer Ray 64
 George Chuvalo 63
 Carlos Zárate Serna 63
 Frank Moody 63
 Eduardo Lausse 62
 Alexis Argüello 62
 Jack Kid Berg 61
 Barbados Joe Walcott 61
 Larry Gains 61
 Adilson Rodrigues 61
 Mickey Walker (boxer) 60
 Freddie Steele 60
 Ike Williams 60
 Cleveland Williams 60
 Gregorio Peralta 60
 Tami Mauriello 60
 Max Baer (boxer) 59
 Young Peter Jackson 59
 Carlos Monzon 59
 Joe Knight (boxer) 59
 Ricardo Moreno 59
 Panama Al Brown 59
 Kid Pascualito 59
 James Red Herring 58
 Eric Esch 58
 Tony Galento 57
 John Henry Lewis 57
 Pascual Perez (boxer) 57
 Charley White 57
 Kid Williams 57
 Len Harvey 57
 Jose Luis Castillo 57
 Bob Fitzsimmons 57
 Tiger Flowers 56
 Georges Carpentier 56
 Pedro Montanez 56
 Irish Bob Murphy 56
 Charles Kid McCoy 55
 Dixie Kid 55
 Gorilla Jones 55
 Freddie Mills 55
 Manuel Ortiz (boxer) 54
 Marcel Thil 54
 Solly Krieger 54
 Jose Napoles 54
 Bennie Briscoe 53
 Obie Walker 53
 Peter Kane 53
 Wladimir Klitschko 53
 Shannon Briggs 53
 Eugene Criqui 53
 Joe Louis 52
 Mike McTigue 52
 Philadelphia Jack O'Brien 52
 Lew Jenkins 52
 Marvin Hagler 52
 Rocky Graziano 52
 Ezzard Charles 52
 Arturo Godoy 51
 Kid Chocolate 51
 Packey McFarland 51
 Jimmy Slattery 51
 Abe Attell 51
 Miguel Angel Castellini 51
 Jorge Vaca 51
 Jorge Paez 51
 Marco Antonio Rubio 51
 Charley Burley 50
 Jose Legra 50
 Eder Jofre 50

See also

 Boxing styles and technique
 Chin (combat sports)
 Full contact karate
 Punch (combat)
 Punching power
 Taekwondo

References

External links
 KO statistics of Mike Tyson, Wladimir Klitschko, Earnie Shavers, George Foreman and other heavyweight boxers
 All famous MMA knockouts
 The differences between knockouts and concussions; a simple discussion for beginning boxers
 https://archive.today/20130505222319/http://www.cyberboxingzone.com/cbzforum/showthread.php?1450-Most-Knockouts-Career

Martial arts terminology
Boxing rules and regulations